U.S. Route 70 (US 70) is a part of the U.S. Highway System that travels from Globe, Arizona, east to Atlantic, North Carolina. In the U.S. state of New Mexico, US 70 extends from the Arizona state line south of Virden and ends at the Texas state line in Texico.

Route description
After entering the state of New Mexico, US 70 heads southeast.  after crossing the state line, it serves as the southern terminus for New Mexico State Road 92 (NM 92). At Lordsburg, US 70 joins with Interstate 10 (I-10) eastbound, splitting off in Las Cruces, and becoming Picacho Avenue in Las Cruces. When Picacho Avenue meets Main Street, US 70 follows Main Street northbound. US 70 then crosses I-25, and has been upgraded at this point to a controlled-access highway until entering the foothills of the Organ Mountains.

As a divided highway, US 70 then crosses the Organ Mountains via San Augustin Pass descends to the valley floor of the Tularosa Basin, and next crosses the White Sands Missile Range. Overhead missile tests can close the highway for a few hours; this generally happens once or twice a week, and typically only for an hour at a time. The road then passes the entrance to White Sands National Park, and shortly after that passes the southern end of Holloman Air Force Base. It then turns northbound, and picks up a concurrency with US 54 upon entering Alamogordo. On the north end of Alamogordo, US 54/US 70 intersects the beginning of US 82 near La Luz. The concurrency with US 54 lasts until Tularosa, and the highway remains divided until US 70 and US 54 diverge. After splitting off to the northeast, US 70 begins an ascent into the Sacramento Mountains and enters the Lincoln National Forest. The road then runs across the Mescalero Apache Indian Reservation and near the resort town of Ruidoso. In Hondo, it begins another concurrency, this time with US 380. US 70 then bypasses Roswell to the northwest, together with US 285. US 70 then heads off to the northeast, running through Portales and Clovis before entering Texas at Texico.

History
When commissioned in 1926, ran from present day US 70 in Clovis, New Mexico through Vaughn, Willard all the way to Holbrook, Arizona. In 1932, US 70 was rerouted to El Paso, Texas, and the old routing was transferred to US 60 and US 260. In 1934, the routing of US 70 was changed again, to Las Cruces; the old route was transferred to US 54.

On July 12, 2021, US 70 between NASA Road and the entrance of White Sands Missile Range was closed to traffic. The highway was reopened the next day.

Junction list

Roswell truck route

U.S. Route 70 Truck (US 70 Truck) runs for  around the northwest side of Roswell. For its entire length, it is multiplexed with Roswell's Relief Route.

References

Transportation in Hidalgo County, New Mexico
Transportation in Grant County, New Mexico
Transportation in Luna County, New Mexico
Transportation in Doña Ana County, New Mexico
Transportation in Otero County, New Mexico
Transportation in Lincoln County, New Mexico
Transportation in Chaves County, New Mexico
Transportation in Roosevelt County, New Mexico
Transportation in Curry County, New Mexico
 New Mexico
70